Thallium(III) hydroxide, Tl(OH)3, also known as thallic hydroxide, is a hydroxide of thallium. It is a white solid.

Thallium(III) hydroxide is a very weak base; it dissociates to give the thallium(III) ion, Tl3+, only in strongly acidic conditions.

Preparation
Thallium(III) hydroxide can be produced by the reaction of thallium(III) chloride with sodium hydroxide or the electrochemical oxidation of Tl+ in alkaline conditions.

References

Hydroxides
Thallium(III) compounds